Morrovalle is a comune (municipality) in the Province of Macerata in the Italian region Marche, located about  south of Ancona and about  east of Macerata.

Morrovalle borders the following municipalities: Corridonia, Macerata, Monte San Giusto, Montecosaro, Montegranaro, Montelupone.

Main sights
 Church of Sant'Agostino
 Church of San Bartolomeo
 Sanctuary of Madonna dell'Acqua Santa

References

External links
 Official website

Cities and towns in the Marche